Space Ritual Live is a live album by Hawkwind recorded at the O2 Shepherd's Bush Empire in London on 22 February 2014 and released in March 2015. It is released as an audio (2xCD) and video (2xDVD). The concert was in aid of various animal rights groups.

Track listing
"Seasons" (Darbyshire, Hone, Chadwick)
"Steppenwolf" (Calvert, Brock)
"Utopia" (Brock, Moorcock)
"Opa Loka" (Hawkwind 2014)
"Spiral Galaxy" (House)
"Reefer Madness" (Calvert, Brock)
"Sentinel" (Darbyshire, Hone, Chadwick)
"Spirit of the Age" (Calvert, Brock)
"Earth Calling" (Brock, Chadwick, Hone, Darbyshire, Reeves, Blake)
"Born to Go"  (Calvert, Brock)
"Down Through The Night" (Brock)
"Poem 1st Landing" (Calvert)
"Lord of Light" (Brock)
"Poem Black Corridor" (Moorcock)
"Space Is Deep" (Brock)
"A Step Into Space" (Brock, Chadwick, Hone, Darbyshire, Reeves, Blake)
"Orgone Accumulator" (Calvert, Brock)
"Upside Down" (Brock)
"10th Second of Forever" (Calvert)
"Brainstorm" (Turner)
"Seven By Seven" (Brock)
"Sonic Attack" (Moorcock, Hawkwind 2014)
Time We Left" (Brock)
"Master of the Universe" (Brock, Turner)
"Welcome to the Future" (Calvert)

Personnel
Hawkwind
Mr Dibs - bass guitar, vocals
Richard Chadwick - drums, vocals
Dead Fred - keyboards, violin 
Tim Blake - keyboards, theremin
Niall Hone - bass guitar, guitar, vocals 
Dave Brock - guitar, keyboards, vocals 
John Etheridge - guitar
Brian Blessed - vocals

Release history
March 2015: Gonzo Media - 2xCD and 1xDVD
March 2015: Gonzo Media - 2xCD and 2xDVD (Special Edition)

References
Gonzo Media

Hawkwind live albums
2015 live albums